Cynthia Cooper is an American accountant who formerly served as the Vice President of Internal Audit at WorldCom. In 2002, Cooper and her team of auditors worked together in secret and often at night to investigate and unearth $3.8 billion in fraud at WorldCom  which, at that time, was the largest corporate fraud in U.S. history.

Cooper was named one of three "People of the Year" by Time magazine in 2002.

Education
Cooper earned her Bachelor of Science in Accounting from Mississippi State University and a Master of Science in Accountancy from the University of Alabama. She is a Certified Fraud Examiner (CFE).

Career
Cooper worked for the Atlanta offices of public accounting firms PricewaterhouseCoopers and Deloitte & Touche, and later became Vice President of Internal Audit at Worldcom.

Cooper stayed with MCI (previously Worldcom) for two years following the fraud.  She and her team helped the company successfully emerge from bankruptcy.

Later career
Since leaving what became MCI, Cooper started her own consulting firm to speak with both professionals and students sharing her experiences and lessons learned.

Writing
Cooper's book about her life and the WorldCom fraud, Extraordinary Circumstances: The Journey of a Corporate Whistleblower, was published in 2008. Profits from the book were given to universities for ethics education.

Personal life
Cooper maintains an office in Brandon, Mississippi. She married Lance Cooper in 1993; they have two children.

Honours
Cooper was named one of three "People of the Year" by Time magazine in 2002, along with fellow whistleblowers Sherron Watkins and Coleen Rowley.

References

Further reading

External links
 Cynthia Cooper website
 Cynthia Cooper talks about her book, Extraordinary Circumstances | C-SPAN

American accountants
Women accountants
Living people
Mississippi State University alumni
University of Alabama alumni
American whistleblowers
People from Clinton, Mississippi
Women in finance
Accounting scandals
Year of birth missing (living people)